Mladen Vukasović (Cyrillic: Младен Вукасовић, born 22 July 1992) is a Montenegrin professional footballer who played for Radnik Surdulica in the Serbian SuperLiga.

He is a younger brother of Marko Vukasović.

Club career
Born in Cetinje, Vukasović played in lower league Serbian clubs Crvena Zvezda Novi Sad, Novi Sad, ČSK Čelarevo, BSK Borča, Senta and Cement Beočin. During winter break of 2016–17 he joined Radnik Surdulica thus making a debut in the Serbian highest level.

References

1992 births
Living people
Sportspeople from Cetinje
Association football forwards
Montenegrin footballers
RFK Novi Sad 1921 players
FK ČSK Čelarevo players
FK BSK Borča players
FK Senta players
FK Cement Beočin players
FK Radnik Surdulica players
FK Odžaci players
Shabab Al-Aqaba Club players
Serbian First League players
Serbian SuperLiga players
Jordanian Pro League players
Montenegrin expatriate footballers
Expatriate footballers in Serbia
Montenegrin expatriate sportspeople in Serbia
Expatriate footballers in Jordan